WWE Books is a subsidiary of World Wrestling Entertainment, Inc., created in 2002 to publish autobiographies of and fiction based on WWE personalities, behind-the-scenes guides to WWE, illustrated books, calendars, young adult books, and other general nonfiction books. The majority of WWE Books are published by Pocket Books, part of the Simon & Schuster Adult Publishing Group. Simon & Schuster UK and Simon & Schuster Australia are the publishers of WWE books in the United Kingdom and Australia. Simon & Schuster publish multiple titles yearly, based on the personalities, programming, storylines, and other topics of interest to WWE and its fans.

In 2014, WWE Books and DK Publishing entered a multi-year publishing partnership to distribute and market WWE book releases on a global scale. The agreement also included digital and various subsidiary rights. DK has published a variety of titles including commemorative books, sticker books, historical guides, autobiographies and encyclopedias.

WWE Books are published in hardcover and large print editions, trade and mass market paperback, in audio on cassette and compact disc, and in eBook editions.

Books published by WWE Books

Fiction
 Journey into Darkness: An Unauthorized History of Kane
 Big Apple Take Down

Novelizations
 See No Evil
 The Marine
 The Condemned
 12 Rounds
 The Marine 2

Children's Books
Mick Foley's Christmas Chaos
Mick Foley's Halloween Hijinx
Tales From Wrescal Lane
A Most Mizerable Christmas

Encyclopedias
 WWE Encyclopedia: The definitive guide to World Wrestling Entertainment (released 2009)
 WWE Encyclopedia Updated & Expanded: The definitive guide to WWE (released 2013)
 WWE Encyclopedia Of Sports Entertainment (released 2016)
 WWE Encyclopedia of Sports Entertainment New Edition (released 2020)

Autobiographies

Miscellaneous
 Are We There Yet?: Tales from the Never-Ending Travels of WWE Superstars
 Divas Uncovered
 Making the Game: Triple H's Approach to a Better Body
 JR's Cookbook
 Main Event: WWE in the Raging 80s
 WWE Unscripted
 The Rise & Fall of ECW: Extreme Championship Wrestling
 Signature Moves
 The Ultimate World Wrestling Entertainment Trivia Book
 WWE Legends
 Have More Money Now by John "Bradshaw" Layfield
 Can You Take The Heat? (Cookbook)
 WWE Presents Comic Series
 My Favorite Match: WWE Superstars Tell the Stories of Their Most Memorable Matches
 The WWE Championship: A Look Back at the Rich History of the WWE Championship 
 WWE 50
 30 Years of WrestleMania
 Ultimate Warrior: A Life Lived Forever – The Legend of a WWE Hero
 WWE Ultimate Superstar Guide
 WWE: 100 Greatest Matches
 The WWE Book of Top 10s
 Undertaker: 25 Years of Destruction
 WWE: The Attitude Era
 Hustle, Loyalty & Respect: The World of John Cena
 WWE Book of Rules: And How to Break Them
 NXT: The Future Is Now
 WWE Absolutely Everything You Need to Know
 The Book of Booty: Shake It. Love It. Never Be It.
 WWE RAW: The First 25 Years
 Creating the Mania: An Inside Look at How WrestleMania Comes to Life
 WWE Ultimate Superstar Guide, 2nd Edition
 The World of The Rock
 WWE: The Official Cookbook
 WWE SmackDown 20 Years and Counting
 WWE Greatest Rivalries
 WWE 35 Years of Wrestlemania
 WWE Kicking Down Doors: Female Superstars Are Ruling the Ring and Changing the Game!
 WWE Beyond Extreme

See also

WWE Heroes
WWE Magazine

References

External links
 

American companies established in 2002
WWE
Publishing companies established in 2002
2002 establishments in Connecticut
Book publishing companies of the United States
Comic book publishing companies of the United States
Book publishing companies based in Connecticut
Companies based in Stamford, Connecticut